New Solos by an Old Master is an album by American jazz pianist Joe Sullivan recorded in 1953 and released on the Riverside label.

Reception

Allmusic awarded the album 4 stars with the review by Scott Yanow stating, "Pianist Joe Sullivan, although only 44 at the time, was already slipping into obscurity when he recorded these nine solo and three trio performances ".

Track listing 
All compositions by Joe Sullivan except as indicated
 "Gin Mill Blues"
 "That's a Plenty" (Lew Pollack, Ray Gilbert) 
 "A Room With a View" (Noël Coward)
 "Sweet Lorraine" (Cliff Burwell, Mitchell Parish) 
 "Hangover Blues"
 "Little Rock Getaway"
 "Honeysuckle Rose" (Andy Razaf, Fats Waller) 
 "Summertime" (George Gershwin, Ira Gershwin, DuBose Heyward) 
 "Fido's Fantasy"
 "My Little Pride and Joy"
 "I Cover the Waterfront" (Johnny Green, Edward Heyman)   
 "Farewell to Riverside"

Personnel 
Joe Sullivan - piano 
Dave Lario - bass (tracks 1-3)
Smoky Stover - drums (tracks 1-3)

References 

1955 albums
Riverside Records albums